Thomas Cyril "Cy" White (1915 – August 4, 1979) was a Canadian curler. He was the second on the Billy Walsh rink that won the Brier Championship for Manitoba 1956. He was a post office employee in Winnipeg. He was married to Winnifred and had three children.

References

1915 births
1979 deaths
Brier champions
Canadian male curlers
Curlers from Ontario
Curlers from Winnipeg